Haaparanta may refer to:

Places
Haparanda Municipality in northern Sweden, also named Haaparanta in Finnish
Haparanda, the seat of Haparanda Municipality

People
Leila Haaparanta (born 1954), Finnish philosopher
Mikko Haaparanta (born 1997), Finnish hockey player
Reijo Haaparanta (born 1958), Finnish wrestler